Cosmisoma fasciculatum is a species of beetle in the family Cerambycidae. It was described by Guillaume-Antoine Olivier in 1795 and can be found in French Guiana and north central Brasil.

References

External links
 

Cosmisoma
Beetles described in 1795